Modified Newtonian dynamics (MOND) is a hypothesis that proposes a modification of Newton's law of universal gravitation to account for observed properties of galaxies. It is an alternative to the hypothesis of dark matter in terms of explaining why galaxies do not appear to obey the currently understood laws of physics.

Created in 1982 and first published in 1983 by Israeli physicist Mordehai Milgrom, the hypothesis' original motivation was to explain why the velocities of stars in galaxies were observed to be larger than expected based on Newtonian mechanics. Milgrom noted that this discrepancy could be resolved if the gravitational force experienced by a star in the outer regions of a galaxy was proportional to the square of its centripetal acceleration (as opposed to the centripetal acceleration itself, as in Newton's second law) or alternatively, if gravitational force came to vary inversely linearly with radius (as opposed to the inverse square of the radius, as in Newton's law of gravity). MOND departs from Newton's laws at extremely small accelerations that are characteristic of the outer regions of galaxies as well as the inter-galaxy forces within galaxy clusters, but which are far below anything encountered in the Solar System or on Earth.

MOND is an example of a class of theories known as modified gravity, and is an alternative to the hypothesis that the dynamics of galaxies are determined by massive, invisible dark matter halos. Since Milgrom's original proposal, proponents of MOND have claimed to successfully predict a variety of galactic phenomena that they state are difficult to understand as consequences of dark matter.

Though MOND explains the anomalously great rotational velocities of galaxies at their perimeters, it does not fully explain the velocity dispersions of individual galaxies within galaxy clusters. MOND reduces the discrepancy between the velocity dispersions and clusters' observed missing baryonic mass from a factor of around 10 to a factor of about 2. However, the residual discrepancy cannot be accounted for by MOND, requiring that other explanations close the gap such as the presence of as-yet undetected missing baryonic matter.

The accurate measurement of the speed of gravitational waves compared to the speed of light in 2017 ruled out a certain class of modified gravity theories but concluded that other MOND theories that dispense with the need for dark matter remained viable. Two years later, theories put forth by Constantinos Skordis and Tom Zlosnik were consistent with gravitational waves that always travel at the speed of light. Later still in 2021, Skordis & Zlosnik developed a subclass of their theory called "RMOND," for "relativistic MOND," which had "been shown to reproduce in great detail the main observations in cosmology, including the cosmic-microwave-background power spectrum, and the matter structure power spectrum."

Overview 

Several independent observations point to the fact that the visible mass in galaxies and galaxy clusters is insufficient to account for their dynamics, when analyzed using Newton's laws. This discrepancy – known as the "missing mass problem" – was first identified for clusters by Swiss astronomer Fritz Zwicky in 1933 (who studied the Coma cluster), and subsequently extended to include spiral galaxies by the 1939 work of Horace Babcock on Andromeda.

These early studies were augmented and brought to the attention of the astronomical community in the 1960s and 1970s by the work of Vera Rubin at the Carnegie Institute in Washington, who mapped in detail the rotation velocities of stars in a large sample of spirals. While Newton's Laws predict that stellar rotation velocities should decrease with distance from the galactic centre, Rubin and collaborators found instead that they remain almost constant – the rotation curves are said to be "flat". This observation necessitates at least one of the following:
{|
|- valign="top"
|(1) || There exists in galaxies large quantities of unseen matter which boosts the stars' velocities beyond what would be expected on the basis of the visible mass alone, or
|- valign="top"
|(2) || Newton's Laws do not apply to galaxies.
|}
Option (1) leads to the dark matter hypothesis; option (2) leads to MOND.

The basic premise of MOND is that while Newton's laws have been extensively tested in high-acceleration environments (in the Solar System and on Earth), they have not been verified for objects with extremely low acceleration, such as stars in the outer parts of galaxies. This led Milgrom to postulate a new effective gravitational force law (sometimes referred to as "Milgrom's law") that relates the true acceleration of an object to the acceleration that would be predicted for it on the basis of Newtonian mechanics. This law, the keystone of MOND, is chosen to reproduce the Newtonian result at high acceleration but leads to different ("deep-MOND") behavior at low acceleration:

Agreement with Newtonian mechanics requires

and consistency with astronomical observations requires

Beyond these limits, the interpolating function is not specified by the hypothesis, although it is possible to weakly constrain it empirically. Two common choices are the "simple interpolating function":

and the "standard interpolating function":

Thus, in the deep-MOND regime ( ≪ ):

Applying this to a star or other object of mass  in circular orbit around mass  (the total baryonic mass of the galaxy), produces

By fitting his law to rotation curve data, Milgrom found  to be optimal.

MOND holds that for accelerations smaller than an a0 value of roughly  accelerations increasingly depart from the standard  Newtonian relationship of mass and distance, wherein gravitational strength is proportional to mass and the inverse square of distance. Specifically, the theory holds that when gravity is well below the a0 value, its rate of change—including the curvature of spacetime—increases with the square root of mass (rather than linearly as per Newtonian law) and decreases linearly with distance (rather than distance squared).

Whenever a small mass, m is near a much larger mass, M, whether it be a star near the center of a galaxy or an object near or on Earth, MOND yields dynamics that are indistinguishably close to those of Newtonian gravity. For instance, there is a certain distance from the center of any given galaxy at which its gravitational acceleration equals a0; at ten times that distance, Newtonian gravity predicts a hundredfold decline in gravity whereas MOND predicts only a tenfold reduction.

However, because the residual Newtonian-like dynamics of MOND continue to decline as the inverse square of distance below a0—just as they do above—they comparatively vanish as they become overwhelmed by the stronger “deep-MOND” linear dynamics of the theory.

MOND predicts stellar velocities that closely match observations for an extraordinarily wide range of distances from galactic centers of mass. The  magnitude of a0 establishes not only the distance from the center of the galaxy at which Newtonian and MOND dynamics diverge, but a0 also establishes the angle (when not plotted with log/log scales) of the non-Newtonian linear slope on velocity/radius graphs like Fig. 1. 

MOND-compliant gravity, which explains galactic-scale observations, was not previously detected closer to Earth, such as in national laboratories or the trajectories of interplanetary spacecraft, because the a0 acceleration, at which the dynamics of MOND begin diverging from Newtonian dynamics, is—as a practical matter—indistinguishably close to perfect weightlessness. Within the Solar System, the v 4 = GMa0 equation makes the effect of the a0 term virtually nonexistent; it is overwhelmed by the enormous—and highly Newtonian—gravitational influence of the Sun as well as the variability of Earth's surface gravity. 

On Earth's surface—and in national laboratories when performing ultra-precise gravimetry—the a0 value is equal to 0.012 microgal (μGal), which is only twelve-trillionths the strength of Earth's gravity. A change in the laws of gravity below this acceleration is far too small to be resolved with even the most sensitive free-fall-style absolute gravimeters available to national labs, like the FG5-X, which is accurate to just ±2 μGal. When considering why MOND's effects aren't detectible with precision gravimetry on Earth, it is important to remember that a0 doesn't represent a spurious force; it is the gravitational strength at which MOND is theorized to significantly begin departing from the Newtonian dynamic. Moreover, the a0 strength is equivalent to the change in Earth's gravity brought about by an elevation difference of 0.04 mm—the width of a fine human hair. Such subtle gravitational details, besides being unresolvable with current gravimeters, are overwhelmed by twice-daily distortions in Earth's shape due to lunar gravitational tides, which can cause local elevation changes nearly 10,000 times greater than 0.04 mm. Such disturbances in local gravity due to tidal distortions are even detectable as variations in the rate of a Shortt double-pendulum clock, which was a national timekeeping standard in the late 1920s.

Even at the edge of the Solar System, the a0 point at which MOND dynamics significantly diverge from Newtonian dynamics is overwhelmed and masked by the much stronger gravitational fields from the Sun and planets, which follow Newtonian gravity. To give a sense of scale to a0, a free-floating mass in space that was exposed for one hour to  would "fall" by just 0.8 millimeter—roughly the thickness of a credit card. An interplanetary spacecraft on a free-flying inertial path well above the Solar System's ecliptic plane (where it is isolated from the gravitational influence of individual planets) would, when at the same distance from the Sun as Neptune, experience a classic Newtonian gravitational strength that is 55,000 times stronger than a0. For small Solar System asteroids, gravitational effects in the realm of a0 are comparable in magnitude to the Yarkovsky effect, which subtly perturbs their orbits over long periods due to momentum transfer from the non-symmetric emission of thermal photons. The Sun's contribution to interstellar galactic gravity doesn't decline to the a0 threshold at which MOND's effects predominate until objects are 41 light-days from the Sun; this is 53 times further away from the Sun than Voyager 2 was in November 2022, which has been in the interstellar medium since 2012.

Despite its vanishingly small and undetectable effects on bodies that are on Earth, within the Solar System, and even in proximity to the Solar System and other planetary systems, MOND successfully explains significant observed galactic-scale rotational effects without invoking the existence of as-yet undetected dark matter particles lying outside of the highly successful Standard Model of particle physics. This is in large part due to MOND holding that exceedingly weak galactic-scale gravity holding galaxies together near their perimeters declines as a very slow linear relationship to distance from the center of a galaxy rather than declining as the inverse square of distance.

Milgrom's law can be interpreted in two ways:
 One possibility is to treat it as a modification to Newton's second law, so that the force on an object is not proportional to the particle's acceleration  but rather to  In this case, the modified dynamics would apply not only to gravitational phenomena, but also those generated by other forces, for example electromagnetism.
 Alternatively, Milgrom's law can be viewed as leaving Newton's Second Law intact and instead modifying the inverse-square law of gravity, so that the true gravitational force on an object of mass  due to another of mass  is roughly of the form  In this interpretation, Milgrom's modification would apply exclusively to gravitational phenomena.

By itself, Milgrom's law is not a complete and self-contained physical theory, but rather an ad hoc empirically motivated variant of one of the several equations that constitute classical mechanics. Its status within a coherent non-relativistic hypothesis of MOND is akin to Kepler's Third Law within Newtonian mechanics; it provides a succinct description of observational facts, but must itself be explained by more fundamental concepts situated within the underlying hypothesis. Several complete classical hypotheses have been proposed (typically along "modified gravity" as opposed to "modified inertia" lines), which generally yield Milgrom's law exactly in situations of high symmetry and otherwise deviate from it slightly. A subset of these non-relativistic hypotheses have been further embedded within relativistic theories, which are capable of making contact with non-classical phenomena (e.g., gravitational lensing) and cosmology. Distinguishing both theoretically and observationally between these alternatives is a subject of current research.

The majority of astronomers, astrophysicists, and cosmologists accept dark matter as the explanation for galactic rotation curves (based on general relativity, and hence Newtonian mechanics), and are committed to a dark matter solution of the missing-mass problem. The primary difference between supporters of ΛCDM and MOND is in the observations for which they demand a robust, quantitative explanation, and those for which they are satisfied with a qualitative account, or are prepared to leave for future work. Proponents of MOND emphasize predictions made on galaxy scales (where MOND enjoys its most notable successes) and believe that a cosmological model consistent with galaxy dynamics has yet to be discovered. Proponents of ΛCDM require high levels of cosmological accuracy (which concordance cosmology provides) and argue that a resolution of galaxy-scale issues will follow from a better understanding of the complicated baryonic astrophysics underlying galaxy formation.

Observational evidence for MOND 

Since MOND was specifically designed to produce flat rotation curves, these do not constitute evidence for the hypothesis, but every matching observation adds to support of the empirical law. Nevertheless, proponents claim that a broad range of astrophysical phenomena at the galactic scale are neatly accounted for within the MOND framework. Many of these came to light after the publication of Milgrom's original papers and are difficult to explain using the dark matter hypothesis. The most prominent are the following:

 In addition to demonstrating that rotation curves in MOND are flat, equation 2 provides a concrete relation between a galaxy's total baryonic mass (the sum of its mass in stars and gas) and its asymptotic rotation velocity. This predicted relation was called by Milgrom the mass-asymptotic speed relation (MASSR); its observational manifestation is known as the baryonic Tully–Fisher relation (BTFR), and is found to conform quite closely to the MOND prediction.
 Milgrom's law fully specifies the rotation curve of a galaxy given only the distribution of its baryonic mass. In particular, MOND predicts a far stronger correlation between features in the baryonic mass distribution and features in the rotation curve than does the dark matter hypothesis (since dark matter dominates the galaxy's mass budget and is conventionally assumed not to closely track the distribution of baryons). Such a tight correlation is claimed to be observed in several spiral galaxies, a fact which has been referred to as "Renzo's rule".
 Since MOND modifies Newtonian dynamics in an acceleration-dependent way, it predicts a specific relationship between the acceleration of a star at any radius from the centre of a galaxy and the amount of unseen (dark matter) mass within that radius that would be inferred in a Newtonian analysis. This is known as the mass discrepancy-acceleration relation, and has been measured observationally. One aspect of the MOND prediction is that the mass of the inferred dark matter goes to zero when the stellar centripetal acceleration becomes greater than a0, where MOND reverts to Newtonian mechanics. In a dark matter hypothesis, it is a challenge to understand why this mass should correlate so closely with acceleration, and why there appears to be a critical acceleration above which dark matter is not required.
 Both MOND and dark matter halos stabilize disk galaxies, helping them retain their rotation-supported structure and preventing their transformation into elliptical galaxies. In MOND, this added stability is only available for regions of galaxies within the deep-MOND regime (i.e., with a < a0), suggesting that spirals with a > a0 in their central regions should be prone to instabilities and hence less likely to survive to the present day. This may explain the "Freeman limit" to the observed central surface mass density of spiral galaxies, which is roughly a0/G. This scale must be put in by hand in dark matter-based galaxy formation models.
 Particularly massive galaxies are within the Newtonian regime (a > a0) out to radii enclosing the vast majority of their baryonic mass. At these radii, MOND predicts that the rotation curve should fall as 1/r, in accordance with Kepler's Laws. In contrast, from a dark matter perspective one would expect the halo to significantly boost the rotation velocity and cause it to asymptote to a constant value, as in less massive galaxies. Observations of high-mass ellipticals bear out the MOND prediction.<ref></</ref>
 In MOND, all gravitationally bound objects with a < a0 – regardless of their origin – should exhibit a mass discrepancy when analyzed using Newtonian mechanics, and should lie on the BTFR. Under the dark matter hypothesis, objects formed from baryonic material ejected during the merger or tidal interaction of two galaxies ("tidal dwarf galaxies") are expected to be devoid of dark matter and hence show no mass discrepancy. Three objects unambiguously identified as Tidal Dwarf Galaxies appear to have mass discrepancies in close agreement with the MOND prediction.
 Recent work has shown that many of the dwarf galaxies around the Milky Way and Andromeda are located preferentially in a single plane and have correlated motions. This suggests that they may have formed during a close encounter with another galaxy and hence be Tidal Dwarf Galaxies. If so, the presence of mass discrepancies in these systems constitutes further evidence for MOND. In addition, it has been claimed that a gravitational force stronger than Newton's (such as Milgrom's) is required for these galaxies to retain their orbits over time.
 In 2020, a group of astronomers analyzing data from the Spitzer Photometry and Accurate Rotation Curves (SPARC) sample together with estimates of the large-scale external gravitational field from an all-sky galaxy catalog, concluded that there was highly statistically significant evidence of violations of the strong equivalence principle in weak gravitational fields in the vicinity of rotationally supported galaxies. They observed an effect consistent with the external field effect of Modified Newtonian dynamics and inconsistent with tidal effects in the Lambda-CDM model paradigm commonly known as the Standard Model of Cosmology.
 In a 2022 published survey of dwarf galaxies from the Fornax Deep Survey (FDS) catalogue, a group of astronomers and physicists conclude that 'observed deformations of dwarf galaxies in the Fornax Cluster and the lack of low surface brightness dwarfs towards its centre are incompatible with ΛCDM expectations but well consistent with MOND.'
 In 2022, Kroupa et al published a study of open star clusters, arguing that asymmetry in the population of leading and trailing tidal tails, and the observed lifetime of these clusters, are inconsistent with Newtonian dynamics but consistent with MOND.

Complete MOND hypotheses 

Milgrom's law requires incorporation into a complete hypothesis if it is to satisfy conservation laws and provide a unique solution for the time evolution of any physical system. Each of the theories described here reduce to Milgrom's law in situations of high symmetry (and thus enjoy the successes described above), but produce different behavior in detail.

Nonrelativistic 

The first hypothesis of MOND (dubbed AQUAL) was constructed in 1984 by Milgrom and Jacob Bekenstein. AQUAL generates MONDian behavior by modifying the gravitational term in the classical Lagrangian from being quadratic in the gradient of the Newtonian potential to a more general function. (AQUAL is an acronym for A QUAdratic Lagrangian.) In formulae:

where   is the standard Newtonian gravitational potential and F is a new dimensionless function. Applying the Euler–Lagrange equations in the standard way then leads to a non-linear generalization of the Newton–Poisson equation:

This can be solved given suitable boundary conditions and choice of F to yield Milgrom's law (up to a curl field correction which vanishes in situations of high symmetry).

An alternative way to modify the gravitational term in the lagrangian is to introduce a distinction between the true (MONDian) acceleration field a and the Newtonian acceleration field aN. The Lagrangian may be constructed so that aN satisfies the usual Newton-Poisson equation, and is then used to find a via an additional algebraic but non-linear step, which is chosen to satisfy Milgrom's law. This is called the "quasi-linear formulation of MOND", or QUMOND, and is particularly useful for calculating the distribution of "phantom" dark matter that would be inferred from a Newtonian analysis of a given physical situation.

Both AQUAL and QUMOND propose changes to the gravitational part of the classical matter action, and hence interpret Milgrom's law as a modification of Newtonian gravity as opposed to Newton's second law. The alternative is to turn the kinetic term of the action into a functional depending on the trajectory of the particle. Such "modified inertia" theories, however, are difficult to use because they are time-nonlocal, require energy and momentum to be non-trivially redefined to be conserved, and have predictions that depend on the entirety of a particle's orbit.

Relativistic 

In 2004, Jacob Bekenstein formulated TeVeS, the first complete relativistic hypothesis using MONDian behaviour. TeVeS is constructed from a local Lagrangian (and hence respects conservation laws), and employs a unit vector field, a dynamical and non-dynamical scalar field, a free function and a non-Einsteinian metric in order to yield AQUAL in the non-relativistic limit (low speeds and weak gravity). TeVeS has enjoyed some success in making contact with gravitational lensing and structure formation observations, but faces problems when confronted with data on the anisotropy of the cosmic microwave background, the lifetime of compact objects, and the relationship between the lensing and matter overdensity potentials.

Several alternative relativistic generalizations of MOND exist, including BIMOND and generalized Einstein-Aether theories. There is also a relativistic generalization of MOND that assumes a Lorentz-type invariance as the physical basis of MOND phenomenology.

The external field effect 

In Newtonian mechanics, an object's acceleration can be found as the vector sum of the acceleration due to each of the individual forces acting on it. This means that a subsystem can be decoupled from the larger system in which it is embedded simply by referring the motion of its constituent particles to their centre of mass; in other words, the influence of the larger system is irrelevant for the internal dynamics of the subsystem. Since Milgrom's law is non-linear in acceleration, MONDian subsystems cannot be decoupled from their environment in this way, and in certain situations this leads to behaviour with no Newtonian parallel. This is known as the "external field effect" (EFE), for which there exists observational evidence.

The external field effect is best described by classifying physical systems according to their relative values of ain (the characteristic acceleration of one object within a subsystem due to the influence of another), aex (the acceleration of the entire subsystem due to forces exerted by objects outside of it), and a0:

  :  Newtonian regime
  :  Deep-MOND regime
  : The external field is dominant and the behavior of the system is Newtonian.
  : The external field is larger than the internal acceleration of the system, but both are smaller than the critical value. In this case, dynamics is Newtonian but the effective value of G is enhanced by a factor of a0/aex.

The external field effect implies a fundamental break with the strong equivalence principle (but not necessarily the weak equivalence principle). The effect was postulated by Milgrom in the first of his 1983 papers to explain why some open clusters were observed to have no mass discrepancy even though their internal accelerations were below a0. It has since come to be recognized as a crucial element of the MOND paradigm.

The dependence in MOND of the internal dynamics of a system on its external environment (in principle, the rest of the universe) is strongly reminiscent of Mach's principle, and may hint towards a more fundamental structure underlying Milgrom's law. In this regard, Milgrom has commented:

It has been long suspected that local dynamics is strongly influenced by the universe at large, a-la Mach's principle, but MOND seems to be the first to supply concrete evidence for such a connection. This may turn out to be the most fundamental implication of MOND, beyond its implied modification of Newtonian dynamics and general relativity, and beyond the elimination of dark matter.

Indeed, the potential link between MONDian dynamics and the universe as a whole (that is, cosmology) is augmented by the observation that the value of a0 (determined by fits to internal properties of galaxies) is within an order of magnitude of cH0, where c is the speed of light and H0 is the Hubble constant (a measure of the present-day expansion rate of the universe). It is also close to the acceleration rate of the universe, and hence the cosmological constant. However, as yet no full hypothesis  has been constructed which manifests these connections in a natural way.

Responses and criticism

Dark matter explanation 

While acknowledging that Milgrom's law provides a succinct and accurate description of a range of galactic phenomena, many physicists reject the idea that classical dynamics itself needs to be modified and attempt instead to explain the law's success by reference to the behavior of dark matter. Some effort has gone towards establishing the presence of a characteristic acceleration scale as a natural consequence of the behavior of cold dark matter halos, although Milgrom has argued that such arguments explain only a small subset of MOND phenomena. An alternative proposal is to modify the properties of dark matter (e.g., to make it interact strongly with itself or baryons) in order to induce the tight coupling between the baryonic and dark matter mass that the observations point to. Finally, some researchers suggest that explaining the empirical success of Milgrom's law requires a more radical break with conventional assumptions about the nature of dark matter. One idea (dubbed "dipolar dark matter") is to make dark matter gravitationally polarizable by ordinary matter and have this polarization enhance the gravitational attraction between baryons.

Outstanding problems for MOND 

The most serious problem facing Milgrom's law is that it cannot eliminate the need for dark matter in all astrophysical systems: galaxy clusters show a residual mass discrepancy even when analyzed using MOND. The fact that some form of unseen mass must exist in these systems detracts from the adequacy of MOND as a solution to the missing mass problem, although the amount of extra mass required is a fifth that of a Newtonian analysis, and there is no requirement that the missing mass be non-baryonic. It has been speculated that 2 eV neutrinos could account for the cluster observations in MOND while preserving the hypothesis's successes at the galaxy scale. Indeed, analysis of sharp lensing data for the galaxy cluster Abell 1689 shows that MOND only becomes distinctive at Mpc distance from the center, so that Zwicky's conundrum remains, and 1.8 eV neutrinos are needed in clusters.

The 2006 observation of a pair of colliding galaxy clusters known as the "Bullet Cluster", poses a significant challenge for all theories proposing a modified gravity solution to the missing mass problem, including MOND. Astronomers measured the distribution of stellar and gas mass in the clusters using visible and X-ray light, respectively, and in addition mapped the inferred dark matter density using gravitational lensing. In MOND, one would expect the "missing mass" to be centred on regions of visible mass which experience accelerations lower than a0 (assuming the external field effect is negligible). In ΛCDM, on the other hand, one would expect the dark matter to be significantly offset from the visible mass because the halos of the two colliding clusters would pass through each other (assuming, as is conventional, that dark matter is collisionless), whilst the cluster gas would interact and end up at the centre. An offset is clearly seen in the observations. It has been suggested, however, that MOND-based models may be able to generate such an offset in strongly non-spherically symmetric systems, such as the Bullet Cluster.

A significant piece of evidence in favor of standard dark matter is the observed anisotropies in the cosmic microwave background. While ΛCDM is able to explain the observed angular power spectrum, MOND has a much harder time, though recently it has been shown that MOND can fit the observations too. MOND also encounters difficulties explaining structure formation, with density perturbations in MOND perhaps growing so rapidly that too much structure is formed by the present epoch. However, forming galaxies more rapidly than in ΛCDM can be a good thing to some extent.

Several other studies have noted observational difficulties with MOND. For example, it has been claimed that MOND offers a poor fit to the velocity dispersion profile of globular clusters and the temperature profile of galaxy clusters, that different values of a0 are required for agreement with different galaxies' rotation curves, and that MOND is naturally unsuited to forming the basis of cosmology. Furthermore, many versions of MOND predict that the speed of light is different from the speed of gravity, but in 2017 the speed of gravitational waves was measured to be equal to the speed of light to high precision. This is well understood in modern relativistic theories of MOND, with the constraint from gravitational waves actually helping by substantially restricting how a covariant theory might be constructed.

Besides these observational issues, MOND and its relativistic generalizations are plagued by theoretical difficulties. Several ad hoc and inelegant additions to general relativity are required to create a theory compatible with a non-Newtonian non-relativistic limit, though the predictions in this limit are rather clear. This is the case for the more commonly used modified gravity versions of MOND, but some formulations (most prominently those based on modified inertia) have long suffered from poor compatibility with cherished physical principles such as conservation laws. Researchers working on MOND generally do not interpret it as a modification of inertia, with only very limited work done on this area.

Proposals for testing MOND 

Several observational and experimental tests have been proposed to help distinguish between MOND and dark matter-based models:

 The detection of particles suitable for constituting cosmological dark matter would strongly suggest that ΛCDM is correct and no modification to Newton's laws is required.
 If MOND is taken as a theory of modified inertia, it predicts the existence of anomalous accelerations on the Earth at particular places and times of the year. These could be detected in a precision experiment. This prediction would not hold if MOND is taken as a theory of modified gravity, as the external field effect produced by the Earth would cancel MONDian effects at the Earth's surface.
 It has been suggested that MOND could be tested in the Solar System using the LISA Pathfinder mission (launched in 2015). In particular, it may be possible to detect the anomalous tidal stresses predicted by MOND to exist at the Earth-Sun saddlepoint of the Newtonian gravitational potential. It may also be possible to measure MOND corrections to the perihelion precession of the planets in the Solar System, or a purpose-built spacecraft.
 One potential astrophysical test of MOND is to investigate whether isolated galaxies behave differently from otherwise-identical galaxies that are under the influence of a strong external field. Another is to search for non-Newtonian behaviour in the motion of binary star systems where the stars are sufficiently separated for their accelerations to be below a0.
 Testing MOND using the redshift-dependence of radial acceleration Sabine Hossenfelder and Tobias Mistele propose a parameter-free MOND model they call Covariant Emergent Gravity and suggest that as measurements of radial acceleration improve, various MOND models and particle dark matter might be distinguishable because MOND predicts a much smaller redshift-dependence.

See also 

 MOND researchers:

References

Further reading

Technical:
Merritt, David (2020). A Philosophical Approach to MOND: Assessing the Milgromian Research Program in Cosmology (Cambridge: Cambridge University Press), 282 pp.  
 
 
 
 
 
 
 

Popular:
 A non-Standard model, David Merritt, Aeon Magazine, July 2021
 Dark matter critics focus on details, ignore big picture, Lee, 14 Nov 2012
 
 "Dark matter" doubters not silenced yet, World Science, 2 Aug 2007
 Does Dark Matter Really Exist?, Milgrom, Scientific American, Aug 2002

External links

 The MOND pages, Stacy McGaugh
 Mordehai Milgrom's website
 "The Dark Matter Crisis" blog, Pavel Kroupa, Marcel Pawlowski
 Pavel Kroupa's website
  Superfluid dark matter may provide a more natural way to arrive at the MOND equation.

Astrophysics
Classical mechanics
Theories of gravity
Unsolved problems in astronomy
Unsolved problems in physics
Astronomical hypotheses
Dark matter
Physical cosmology
Celestial mechanics
Physics beyond the Standard Model
Matter
Theoretical physics